High Land, Hard Rain is the debut album by jangle pop band Aztec Camera, released in 1983. Three tracks from the album originally appeared on the Oblivious EP, which reached number 18 on the UK Singles Chart when re-released in November 1983. The album itself reached number 22 on the UK Albums Chart.

Recording and content
The majority of the album was recorded at the ICC Studios in Eastbourne. The album included two early songs by Roddy Frame, "We Could Send Letters" written in 1979 and "Lost Outside the Tunnel" which was performed by Frame's pre-Aztec Camera band Neutral Blue. The single "Oblivious" was a conscious attempt to write a pop hit. "Down the Dip" was inspired by a local East Kilbride pub located close to Duncanrig Secondary School, Roddy Frame's high school. Originally called "The Diplomat" ("The Dip" for short), it is now called Gardenhall Inn.

Release
Aztec Camera's debut album, High Land, Hard Rain, was produced by John Brand and Bernie Clarke for the Rough Trade record label. The album was released in April 1983 and was distributed in different formats on Domino Recording Co. Ltd. in the US (in addition to Sire), WEA and Celluloid in France, Nuevos Medios, Nuevos Medios in Spain, Powderworks in Australia, MVM Records in Portugal, and WEA for a general European release.

Critical reception

The album was successful, garnering significant critical acclaim, and peaked at number 129 on the Billboard 200. Frame later revealed that the song "Oblivious" was consciously written as a Top of the Pops-type pop song and received a corresponding degree of popularity.

Track listing

Personnel
Roddy Frame – vocals, guitar, harmonica
Bernie Clarke – piano, organ
Campbell Owens – bass
Dave Ruffy – drums, percussion

References

External links
 Domino's page on 30th Anniversary Edition of High Land, Hard Rain

1983 debut albums
Aztec Camera albums
Sire Records albums